is a former Japanese football player.

Club statistics

References

External links

1986 births
Living people
Association football people from Fukuoka Prefecture
Japanese footballers
J1 League players
J2 League players
Urawa Red Diamonds players
Ehime FC players
Fagiano Okayama players
Association football defenders